Bloom is a surname. Notable people with the surname include:

 Adam Bloom (born 1970), English comedian
 Alan Bloom (1906–2005), English nurseryman
 Allan Bloom (1930–1992), American philosopher and author
 Andy Bloom (born 1973), American shot putter
 Benjamin Bloom (1913–1999), American educator
 Benjamin Bloom (musician) (born 1982), English musician
 Bill Bloom  (born 1948), American songwriter and musician
 Bobby Bloom (1946–1974), American singer-songwriter
 Brian Bloom (born 1970), American actor, voice actor and screenwriter
 Chaim Bloom (born 1983), American Chief Baseball Officer for the Boston Red Sox
 Claire Bloom (born 1931), British actor
 David Bloom (1963–2003), NBC journalist
 David P. Bloom (born 1964), American fraudster
 D. Dudley Bloom (1922–2015), American businessman
 Doris Bloom (born 1954), South African painter
 Gary Bloom, British sports commentator
 Gilad Bloom (born 1967), Israeli tennis player
 Godfrey Bloom (born 1949), British economist and politician
 Harold Bloom (1930–2019), American literary critic
 Harry Bloom (1913–1981), South African novelist and activist
 Howard Bloom (born 1943), American author
 Hyman Bloom (1913–2009), American artist 
 Jeremiah B. Bloom (1913–1983), New York state senator
 Jeremy Bloom (born 1982), American athlete
 John Bloom (disambiguation), several people
 Leyna Bloom, American fashion model, dancer, and transgender activist
 Lily Bloom, French actress
 Louis A. Bloom (1900–1988), American politician and judge
 Luka Bloom (born 1955), Irish musician
 Mark Bloom (born 1987), American soccer defender
 Matt Bloom (born 1972), American wrestler
 Molly Bloom (born 1978), American author
 Moses Bloom (1833–1893), American politician, mayor of Iowa City
 Myer Bloom (1928–2016), Canadian physicist
 Orlando Bloom (born 1977), English actor
 Paul Bloom  (born 1963), Canadian-American psychologist
 Philip Bloom (disambiguation), several people
 Prescott E. Bloom (1942–1986), American politician and lawyer
 Rachel Bloom (born 1987), American actress
 Rube Bloom (1902–1976), American composer
 Ryan Alexander Bloom (born 1985), American musician and author
 Sol Bloom (1870–1949) Member, U. S. House of Representatives (D-NY)
 Steve Bloom (born 1953), photographer
 Ursula Bloom (1892–1984), English writer
 Verna Bloom (1938–2019), American actress
 William Elijah Bloom (1860-1938), American politician

Fictional characters
 Apple Bloom, in the My Little Pony franchise
 Davis Bloome, in the TV series Smallville 
 Josephine Bloom, played by Marion Cotillard in the 2003 film Big Fish
 Leo Bloom, in Mel Brooks's 1967 comic film The Producers
 Leopold Bloom, in James Joyce's Ulysses
 Molly Bloom, in James Joyce's Ulysses
 Louis Bloom, in Dan Gilroy's 2014 dramatic film Nightcrawler
 Stuart Bloom, in the TV series The Big Bang Theory

See also
 Blum (disambiguation)

Jewish surnames